"Spanish Ladies" (Roud 687) is a traditional British naval song, describing a voyage from Spain to the Downs from the viewpoint of ratings of the Royal Navy.

Origins 
A ballad by the name "Spanish Ladies" was registered in the English Stationer's Company on December 14, 1624. The oldest mention of the present song does not, however, appear until the 1796 logbook of HMS Nellie, making it more likely an invention of the Napoleonic era. The timing of the mention in the Nellie's logbook suggests that the song was created during the War of the First Coalition (1793–96), when the Royal Navy carried supplies to Spain to aid its resistance to revolutionary France. It probably gained in popularity during the later Peninsular War when British soldiers were transported throughout the Iberian peninsula to assist rebels fighting against the French occupation. After their victory over the Grande Armée, these soldiers were returned to Britain but forbidden to bring their Spanish wives, lovers, and children with them.

The song predates the proper emergence of the sea shanty. Shanties were the work songs of merchant sailors, rather than naval ones. However, in his 1840 novel Poor Jack, Captain Frederick Marryat reports that the song "Spanish Ladies"—though once very popular—was "now almost forgotten" and he included it in whole in order to "rescue it from oblivion". The emergence of shanties in the mid-19th century then revived its fortunes, to the point where it is now sometimes included as a "borrowed song" within the genre.

Lyrics 
"Spanish Ladies" is the story of British naval seamen sailing north from Spain and along the English Channel. The crew are unable to determine their latitude by sighting as the distance between Ushant to the south and the Scillies to the north is wide. Instead, they locate themselves by the depth and the sandy bottom they have sounded. Arthur Ransome, in his novel Peter Duck, suggests that the succession of headlands on the English shore indicates the ship tacking up-channel away from the French coast, identifying a new landmark on each tack. However, one verse (quoted below) states that they had the wind at southwest and squared their mainsails to run up the Channel, rather than beating against a northeasterly.

This is the version recorded in the 1840 Poor Jack. It is one of many. Notable variations are shown in parentheses after each line.

Traditional recordings 
Some traditional English performances of the song can be heard on the British Library Sound Archive:

 Walter Pardon, a Norfolk carpenter who had learnt it from a man who had in turn learnt it from a sailor 
 Ron Fletcher of Gloucestershire who had first heard it sung by two old ladies in St. Johns, Newfoundland while he was serving in World War II
 Harold Sykes of Hull, Yorkshire
 Edward Tise of Smarden, Kent

The folk song collectors Edith Fowke, Laura Boulton and Helen Creighton recorded versions from traditional singers in Canada, particularly in Nova Scotia. 

Helen Hartness Flanders recorded a man named William J Thompson of Canaan, Vermont, USA singing "Gay Spanish Ladies", which can be heard online courtesy of the Helen Hartness Flanders Collection.

Variants 
The song has been found in several different minor and major keys. Cecil Sharp considers the version in minor keys to be the original.

Several variants exist that utilize the same melody but substitute different lyrics:
"Brisbane Ladies" is an Australian tune about drovers instead of sailors. 
A significantly modified version called "The Ryans and the Pittmans", widely known as "We'll Rant and We'll Roar", is from Newfoundland; this version was recorded as "Rant and Roar" by Great Big Sea on their album Up.
There is an American major-key variant called "Yankee Whalermen".  This variant is sung by the character Quint in the movie Jaws, and resets the destination from England to Boston. 
A version was created especially for the Bluenose, a famed Canadian ship based in Nova Scotia.
The song forms part of Sir Henry J. Wood's composition Fantasia on British Sea Songs.
A variant called 'The Spanish Bride' was recorded by John Tams for the TV series Sharpe with the lyrics changed to reflect British soldiers returning home at the end of the Peninsular War.

In other media 
As mentioned above, the song is quoted in full in the 1840 novel Poor Jack. It appears in part in the 40th chapter of Herman Melville's Moby-Dick and in chapter 7 of Post Captain, the 2nd book and in Treason's Harbour, the 9th book of Patrick O'Brian's Aubrey–Maturin series of novels set during the Napoleonic Wars. It also appears in Arthur Ransome's books Swallows and Amazons and "Missee Lee" and Wilbur Smith's works Monsoon and Blue Horizon.

The song notably appeared in the 1975 film Jaws. It was also sung in the 2003 film Master and Commander: The Far Side of the World, based on the O'Brian books.

Robert Shaw, the actor who sang the tune in Jaws, also sang it years earlier in a 1956 episode of the television show The Buccaneers. It has also appeared in the series Homicide, Sharpe, Hornblower, Jimmy Neutron, The Mentalist, Gossip Girl, Monsuno, and Turn.

The video games Assassin's Creed IV: Black Flag and Assassin's Creed: Rogue feature "Spanish Ladies" as one of the collectible sea shanties that the sailors on the player's ship may begin singing while sailing between islands while out of combat.

In The Mentalist episode "Ladies in Red" Patrick Jane sings the tune to himself whilst attempting to find the correct code to open the victim's panic room.

Michael McCormack and Guitarist Greg Parker recorded a version of the song for the end titles of the Jaws documentary "The Shark Is Still Working: The Impact & Legacy of Jaws".

Australian singer-songwriter Sarah Blasko produced a cover of the song which featured in the series Turn: Washington's Spies.

References

External links 
 Yankee Whalermen at Contemplator
 Rant and Roar (Canadian) at Contemplator
 A Yankee version using New Bedford
 A user-created map showing all the English landmarks mentioned during the English Channel leg of the voyage can be found at 

Sea shanties
Year of song unknown
18th-century songs